Raining Up is Máiréad Nesbitt's solo musical album, which was recorded and published in 2001 by Vertical Records, UK. It was also released in North America 2006 under the label Manhattan. The musical CD contains a combination of traditional Irish, Scottish and newly composed Irish and contemporary tunes. Tracks were written by Máiréad and her brother Karl.

The album was produced by Manus Lunny and Colm O'Foghlú.

The album peaked on the Billboard World Music album chart at #12 in 2006.

Track listing

All arrangements: (MCPS)

Tracks 1,2,3,4,5,6,8,10,11: produced by Mánus Lunny

Tracks 7,9,12,13,14: produced by Colm O'Foghlú

Personnel:
 Máiréad Nesbitt: vocals, guitar, bouzouki, fiddle
 Kathleen Nesbitt: fiddle
 Frances Nesbitt: fiddle
 Karl Nesbitt: didjeridu, bodhran
 Sean Nesbitt: box
 Michael McGoldrick: flute, pipes
 Colm O Foghlú: whistle, keyboards, percussion, programming
 Steve Kettley: trumpet
 Toby Shippey: trumpet
 Ryan Quigley: trumpet
 Greg Sheehan: talking drum
 Dónal Lunny: bodhran
 Ron Aslan: programming

References

Máiréad Nesbitt albums
2001 albums